George Clinton Sweeney (July 23, 1895 – November 5, 1966) was a United States district judge of the United States District Court for the District of Massachusetts.

Education and career

Born in Gardner, Massachusetts, Sweeney received a Bachelor of Laws from Georgetown Law in 1922. He was in the United States Army as a Sergeant from 1917 to 1918. He was in private practice in Gardner from 1924 to 1935. He served as Mayor of Gardner from 1931 to 1933. He was an assistant attorney general of the United States Department of Justice from 1933 to 1935.  He was the first Knight of Columbus to be made a judge in Massachusetts.

Federal judicial service

Sweeney was nominated by President Franklin D. Roosevelt on August 20, 1935, to a seat on the United States District Court for the District of Massachusetts vacated by Judge James Arnold Lowell. He was confirmed by the United States Senate on August 21, 1935, and received his commission on August 24, 1935. He served as Chief Judge from 1948 to 1965 and as a member of the Judicial Conference of the United States from 1958 to 1961. He assumed senior status on September 30, 1966. Sweeney served in that capacity until his death on November 5, 1966.

References

Sources
 

1895 births
1966 deaths
Georgetown University Law Center alumni
Mayors of places in Massachusetts
Judges of the United States District Court for the District of Massachusetts
United States district court judges appointed by Franklin D. Roosevelt
United States Assistant Attorneys General for the Civil Division
20th-century American judges
United States Army soldiers
People from Gardner, Massachusetts